Brian Thomas Perry (April 6, 1944 – January 16, 2023) was a British-born Canadian professional ice hockey left wing.  He played in the National Hockey League with the Oakland Seals and Buffalo Sabres, as well as in the World Hockey Association with the New York Raiders, New York Golden Blades, Jersey Knights, and San Diego Mariners. Perry was born in Aldershot, England, but grew up in Kirkland Lake, Ontario.

In his NHL career, Perry played in 96 games, scoring 16 goals and adding 29 assists.  In the WHA, he played in 145 games, scoring 33 goals and adding 31 assists. The highlight of Brian's NHL career came on 19 February 1969. Playing for the Oakland Seals, Brian scored a hat trick in a 5–2 victory over the Chicago Blackhawks in Oakland.

Perry died on January 16, 2023, at the age of 78.

Career statistics

Regular season and playoffs

See also
List of National Hockey League players from the United Kingdom

References

External links

1944 births
2023 deaths
Buffalo Sabres players
Ice hockey people from Ontario
Jersey Knights players
New Haven Blades players
New York Golden Blades players
New York Raiders players
New York Rovers players
Oakland Seals players
Providence Reds players
San Diego Mariners players
Seattle Totems (WHL) players
Sportspeople from Kirkland Lake
Syracuse Blazers players